KGBC (1540 AM) is a terrestrial American brokered time AM radio facility, paired with an FM relay translator. KGBC is licensed to serve the City of Galveston, Texas. K269GS is licensed to serve Houston, broadcasting from a location near Baytown, off of W Baker Road & Texas Highway 330. Established in 1947, KGBC Radio is wholly owned by SIGA Broadcasting, Inc., of Houston, Texas.

 it is the only radio station in Galveston.

Translator

Programming
In the early 2000s, the station carried a Catholic radio format. It later shifted to non-English programming until being forced off the air by Hurricane Ike in September 2008. The station resumed full-power broadcasting in February 2009 with a mix of local talk radio and classic hits.

History

Galveston Broadcasting Company Signs On KGBC
The U.S. Federal Communications Commission (FCC) granted a construction permit in August 1946 for a new station to broadcast on 1540 kilohertz and serve the community of Galveston, Texas. The station began broadcasting under program test authority on February 1, 1947, and received its original broadcast license in May 1947. Chosen to represent original owner James W. Bradner's Galveston Broadcasting Company, the "KGBC" call sign was assigned by the FCC. The station has served the Galveston area since 1947. At its launch, the station broadcast with 1,000 watts of power and only during daylight hours. In 1950, the station added nighttime service, but in a directional array and at just 250 watts. The station powers down at night to protect clear-channel station KXEL in Waterloo, Iowa, from skywave interference.

KGBC-FM Launches
After 17 years of continuous operation by Galveston Broadcasting Company, KGBC was sold to Harbor Broadcasting Company, Inc., effective December 20, 1964. On February 11, 1968, KGBC's new owners launched an FM sister station as "KGBC-FM" (106.1 FM). In 1974, the FM station was sold, moved to 106.5 FM, and re-licensed as "KUFO". With shifting ownership and declining fortunes, the station became "KXKX" in 1979 and "KQQK" in 1986 before signing off forever and having its license cancelled by the FCC in March 1989. , the 106.5 frequency is occupied by an unrelated Spanish-language religious station licensed as "KOVE-FM".

Siga Purchases KGBC
On February 20, 2002, Prets/Blum Media Company, Inc., contracted to sell KGBC to SIGA Broadcasting Corporation. The sale was approved by the FCC on April 25, 2002, and the transaction was completed on May 9, 2002.

On September 13, 2008, Hurricane Ike made landfall on the upper Texas coast causing flooding and widespread damage. The KGBC broadcast facilities suffered both flooding and damage, knocking the station off the air and keeping it dark for several weeks. The station resumed broadcasting (albeit with low power) on October 6, 2008, and returned to full power operation on February 3, 2009. After spending all of 2009 as a "live and local" broadcaster, the station began leasing all of its airtime, starting January 1, 2010.

In May 2016, KGBC flipped to a business news format with programming provided by the BizTalkRadio network.

In October 2017, 1540 imaging was changed to "KGBC Radio" omitting mention of either the AM or FM dial position altogether. In February 2018, KGBC began simulcasting KLVL fulltime in order to expand the Synergy Radio Network onto the Island and surrounding coastal communities. This proved to be short lived as Siga leased out KGBC and K269GS in April, which both began to air Tejano, branded as Puro Tejano 101.7 FM & 1540 AM.

KGBC's Texas sister stations with SIGA Broadcasting include KTMR (1130 AM, Converse), KLVL (1480 AM, Pasadena), KAML (990 AM, Kenedy-Karnes City), KHFX (1140 AM, Cleburne), and KFJZ (870 AM, Fort Worth).

References

External links
FCC History Cards for KGBC
KGBC official website

GBC
Companies based in Galveston, Texas
Radio stations established in 1947
Mass media in Galveston, Texas
1947 establishments in Texas
Tejano music